Dragon Lee vs. The Five Brothers is a 1978 Bruceploitation martial arts film starring Dragon Lee. The film is commonly included on public domain dvd sets.

Synopsis
Dragon is trusted to deliver a list containing name of anti-Ching revolutionaries to the Ming leaders but is challenged by Ching loyalists along the way.

Reception

The Video Vacuum gave the film 2 stars out of 4, and wrote: "The usually charismatic Dragon Lee gets lost in the shuffle and is unable to carry the cumbersome plot."
Variedcelluloid.net said the film was "unfortunately everything you hope not to find in a martial arts flick" and called it boring and a dud.

See also
 List of films in the public domain in the United States

References

External links
 
 

1978 films
1978 martial arts films
1978 action films
Bruceploitation films
Kung fu films
Hong Kong martial arts films
1980s Hong Kong films
1970s Hong Kong films